Šober is a dispersed settlement in the hills northwest of Maribor in northeastern Slovenia. It belongs to the City Municipality of Maribor.

The local church, built on a hill above the settlement, is a landmark visible from afar. It is dedicated to Saint Urban and was built in the 16th century. Between 1784 and 1855 it was abandoned, and was then restored in 1860.

References

External links
Šober on Geopedia

Populated places in the City Municipality of Maribor